Dude Ranch is a 1931 American Western film directed by Frank Tuttle and written by Milton Krims, Percy Heath, Grover Jones and Lloyd Corrigan. The film stars Jack Oakie, Stuart Erwin, Eugene Pallette, Mitzi Green, June Collyer, Charles Sellon and Cecil Weston. The film was released on May 16, 1931, by Paramount Pictures.

Cast 
 Jack Oakie as Jennifer / Vance Kilroy
 Stuart Erwin as Chester Carr
 Eugene Pallette as Judd / Black Jed
 Mitzi Green as Alice Merridew
 June Collyer as Susan Meadows
 Charles Sellon as Spruce Meadows
 Cecil Weston as Mrs. Merridew
 George Webb as Burson
 Guy Oliver as Simonson
 James Crane as Blaze Denton

References

External links 
 

1931 films
1930s English-language films
American Western (genre) films
1931 Western (genre) films
Paramount Pictures films
Films directed by Frank Tuttle
American black-and-white films
1930s American films